Matthew Harris may refer to:

 Matthew Harris (Irish politician) (1826–1890), Irish MP
 Matthew Harris (Australian politician) (1841–1917), mayor of Sydney
 Matthew Harris (composer) (born 1956), American composer, see Cultural depictions of Dylan Thomas
 Matthew James Harris (born 1968), Australian serial killer
 Mathew Harris, curler
 Matt Harris (screenwriter), American screenwriter